The Flathead Beacon is an American weekly newspaper serving northwest Montana, owned by the American television personality Maury Povich.

Founding 
The Flathead Beacon was founded in 2007 by Maury Povich, who was best known for hosting the talk show Maury. But Povich had roots in traditional journalism. His father, Shirley Povich, covered sports for The Washington Post. Maury Povich started his career as a television news anchor, and he started a new news outlet to honor his father's legacy. Povich owns a home with his wife, Connie Chung, in Bigfork, Montana.

Operations 
The first edition of the Beacon was published in May 2007, and ran to 24 pages. The founding, and current, editor-in-chief is Kellyn Brown.

Recognition 
The Montana Newspaper Association named the Flathead Beacon the state's best large weekly 10 times since 2009. In 2014, Outside Magazine ranked the Flathead Beacon the 58th best place to work in the United States, citing the "intense employee pride in the publishing company".
The Flathead Beacon police blotter is often cited by Miami Herald columnist Dave Barry on his blog.

See also 
 List of newspapers in Montana

References

External links 

 

Newspapers published in Montana